Bembina was a village of ancient Argolis. Strabo says that it was a small village that was located between Cleonae and Phlius, near Nemea. According to Greek mythology, the haunts of the Nemean Lion are said to have been near Bembina.

Its site is unlocated.

References

Populated places in ancient Argolis
Former populated places in Greece
Locations in Greek mythology